Pyocins are bacteriocins produced by bacteria belonging to the Pseudomonas genus. François Jacob described the first pyocin in 1954. Pyocins can be divided into three distinct classes: S-type, R-type, and F-type pyocins. S-type pyocins are colicin-like bacteriocins as R-type and F-type pyocins belong to tailocins.

S-type pyocins 
S-type (soluble) pyocins are binary protein complexes that compose of a cytotoxic protein and an immunity protein that protects the producing strain from cytotoxic effects. The amino-terminal domain of the protein takes part in receptor binding as the carboxy-terminal domain is responsible for cytotoxic effect. Most S-type pyocins act by degrading DNA and RNA but some exhibit their cytotoxicity by forming pores to cell surface or by lipid degradation. Several S-type pyocins have been found so far: S1, S2,  AP41, S3, S4, S5, S6.

Pyocin G is an example of a novel S1-type nuclease pyocin. It binds to hemin uptake receptor Hur on target cell surface and translocates to the cytoplasm where it degrades DNA. Pyocin G uses inner membrane proteins TonB1 and FtsH for translocation. Pyocin G is highly active against P.aeruginosa clinical isolates in vitro as well as in vivo and could be active in P.aeruginosa infections also in humans

In silico methods are revealing also new types of S-pyocins when large databases of sequenced DNA from Pseudomonas-genus are being screened for new pyocin coding sequences.

R-type and F-type pyocins 
R- and F-type pyocins have been mainly investigated in P.aeruginosa. These two types differ by their structure; they are both composed of a sheath and a hollow tube forming a long helicoidal hexameric structure attached to a baseplate. There are multiple tail fibers that allow the particle to bind to the target cell. However, the R-pyocins are a large, rigid contractile tail-like structure whereas the F-pyocins are small flexible, non-contractile tail-like structures.

To date five subgroups of R-type pyocins have been discovered: R1 to R5. F-type pyocins discovered so far are pyocin 28, 430f, F1, F2, and F3.

References 

Bacteriocins